Blunder is a Channel 4 comedy sketch series from 2006 that originally aired on E4. One series of six episodes aired.

Characters

The Baron
The Baron was infamous for his use of obscene language. Channel 4 were criticised by Ofcom for allowing this to be aired. Channel 4 said in their defence that a lot of other more offensive bad language had been used in the same time slot. Channel 4 issued a spoof apology at the end of the second episode which was interrupted by a barrage of insults from the Baron.

External links 
 
 http://www.channel4.com/programmes/blunder/episode-guide

2000s British television sketch shows
2006 British television series debuts
2006 British television series endings
Channel 4 sketch shows